The Soviet Union National Road Race Championships were cycling races that were held annually to determine the Soviet cycling champion in road racing, across several categories of riders. The event was first held in 1947 and was won by Vladimir Lassi. Up until 1989 the Soviet cyclists were not allowed to compete as professionals so all the national championships were classed as amateur events. From 1989 until the dissolution of the Soviet Union in 1991 the race was considered professional.

Men

Amateur (1947 to 1989)
This list is as complete a possible with the sources available.
Source:

Professional (1989 to 1991)
Source:

1992 onward
Following on from the Dissolution, each country started their own national championships in the year's following.
 Azerbaijani National Road Race Championships
 Belarusian National Road Race Championships
 Estonian National Road Race Championships
 Georgian National Road Championships
 Kazakhstan National Road Race Championships
 Latvian National Road Race Championships
 Lithuanian National Road Race Championships
 Moldovan National Road Race Championships
 Russian National Road Race Championships
 Ukrainian National Road Race Championships
 Uzbekistan National Road Race Championships

References

External links

National road cycling championships
Recurring events established in 1947